Club Waterpolo Dos Hermanas, also known as Dos Hermanas Emasesa for sponsorship reasons, is a Spanish water polo club from Dos Hermanas, province of Seville established in 1993. It is best known for its women's team, which has played in the División de Honor since 2009. In 2011 it made its debut in the LEN Trophy.

References

Water polo clubs in Spain
Sports clubs established in 1993
1993 establishments in Spain
Sports teams in Andalusia
Province of Seville